The enzyme dihydroxy-acid dehydratase catalyzes the chemical reaction

2,3-dihydroxy-3-methylbutanoate  3-methyl-2-oxobutanoate + H2O

This enzyme participates in valine, leucine and isoleucine biosynthesis and pantothenate and coenzyme A (CoA) biosynthesis.

Nomenclature 

This enzyme belongs to the family of lyases, specifically the hydro-lyases, which cleave carbon-oxygen bonds.  The systematic name of this enzyme class is 2,3-dihydroxy-3-methylbutanoate hydro-lyase (3-methyl-2-oxobutanoate-forming). Other names in common use include 
 acetohydroxyacid dehydratase,
 α,β-dihydroxyacid dehydratase,
 2,3-dihydroxyisovalerate dehydratase,
 α,β-dihydroxyisovalerate dehydratase,
 dihydroxy acid dehydrase,
 DHAD,
 and 2,3-dihydroxy-acid hydro-lyase.

References

Further reading 

 
 

EC 4.2.1
Enzymes of unknown structure